The Castle of Pinhel is a Portuguese castle in the civil parish of Pinhel, in the municipality of Pinhel, central-eastern district of Guarda. 

It has been listed as a Monumento Nacional National monument since 1950. Located in historic Pinhel, often known as Cidade Falcão, on a hill (overlooking the Côa river and Marofa mountain), it is one of the more important castles along the Côa river Valley.

External links

Pinhel Castle at IPPAR  

Pinhel
Pinhel
Pinhel
National monuments in Guarda District